The 1960 Chatham Cup was the 33rd annual nationwide knockout football competition in New Zealand.

The competition was run on a regional basis, with regional associations each holding separate qualifying rounds. Teams taking part in the final rounds are known to have included North Shore United, Hamilton Technical Old Boys, Kahukura (Bay of Plenty), Eastern Union (Gisborne), Moturoa AFC (New Plymouth), Napier Rovers, Wanganui Athletic, Kiwi United (Manawatu), Masterton Athletic (Wairarapa), Northern Wellington, Nelson Athletic (Tasman), Technical Old Boys (Christchurch), Northern (Dunedin), and Invercargill Thistle (Southland)

The 1960 final
North Shore United won the cup for a second time, having previously been champions in 1952. The aggregate of eight goals in the final equalled the record set in the 1940 final, previously equalled in 1955 and 1958. The final was the perfect way for North Shore to celebrate their 75th anniversary. From a 1-1 half-time deadlock, NSU quickly raced to a 3–1 lead. Tech reduced the deficit before North Shore added two more goals. Technical completed the scoring with the sixth goal of the half, but were left two goals adrift of the winners. North Shore United's goals were scored by Tony Lowndes (2), John Ryan, Tom Paterson, and Ken Armstrong, while Ted Charlton, John Campbell, and Arthur Verham scored for Tech.

Results

North and South Island semi-finals

North & South Island Finals

Final

References

Rec.Sport.Soccer Statistics Foundation New Zealand 1960 page

Chatham Cup
Chatham Cup
Chatham Cup
August 1960 sports events in New Zealand